Mr. Cinema also known as Call Me Left (老港正傳) is a 2007 Hong Kong film starring Anthony Wong, Teresa Mo, Ronald Cheng and Karen Mok.

Plot
The story is about a pro-communist leftist Zhou Heung-Kong (Anthony Wong) who grew up in the pre-1997 British colony of Hong Kong starting from the 1950s.  He lives with his wife Ying (Teresa Mo) who mostly raises the family by herself.  Zhou has fantasies of going to Tiananmen Square, but has always been too poor to do so.  They eventually find themselves in a HK transferred over to the People's Republic of China.  In the end Zhou realised he sacrificed everything for the communist cause, and his family is left with nothing.

Cast
 Anthony Wong as Zo Heung Kong
 Teresa Mo as Chan Sau-ying
 Ronald Cheng as Zo Chong
 Karen Mok as Luk Min
 Paw Hee-Ching as Lee Choi-ha
 John Shum as Luk Yau

Production note
The film has been criticised for its "selective history" for covering a long period of HK's history, but does not mention the 1989 Tiananmen Square Protests.  The Hong Kong 1967 Leftist Riots was only covered briefly, and China's support for its HK-based loyalists is never addressed.  The name of Anthony Wong's character Zhou Heung Kong is pronounced similar to "Left(ist) Hong Kong".

Critical reception
The film received mixed reviews. One of them, by Vivienne Chow of Muse magazine, applauded Chiu for 'initiating the idea of telling a Hong Kong story from the perspective of the leftists for the first time,' but deemed the movie 'ultimately overambitious'.

See also
 The True Story of Ah Q

References

External links
 

2007 films
Hong Kong comedy-drama films
2000s Hong Kong films